Leland is an unincorporated community and census-designated place (CDP) in the U.S. state of Michigan. As of the 2020 census it had a population of 410. From 1883 to 2004, Leland was the county seat of Leelanau County, which has since moved to Suttons Bay Township.

Part of Leland Township, Leland is situated on an isthmus between Lake Leelanau and Lake Michigan, and is bisected by the Leland River, flowing from the former to the latter. Leland is a significant tourism destination and summer colony, and is located nearby Sleeping Bear Dunes National Lakeshore. Leland also serves as the departure point for ferry service to North and South Manitou Islands, both of which are wholly included in the National Lakeshore.

History

Leland is built on the site of one of the oldest and largest Ottawa villages on the Leelanau Peninsula. Where the Leland (Carp) River flows into Lake Michigan, there was a natural fish ladder (which was a traditional Native American fishing grounds). The settlement was called Mishi-me-go-bing, meaning "the place where canoes run up into the river to land, because they have no harbor", or alternatively Che-ma-go-bing or Chi-mak-a-ping.

White settlers, who began arriving in the 1830s, also took advantage of the location as a fishing settlement. White settlement increased after Antoine Manseau, with his son Antoine Jr., and John Miller, built a dam and sawmill on the river in 1854. The settlers built wooden docks, which allowed steamers and schooners to transport new settlers and supplies.

From 1870 to 1884, the Leland Lake Superior Iron Co. operated an iron smelter north of the river mouth, supplied with ore from the Upper Peninsula and charcoal made from local maple and beech timber; the charcoal was produced in fourteen beehive kilns near the smelting furnace, which produced up to 40 tons of iron per day. In 1884, the plant was sold to the Leland Lumber Co., which operated a sawmill on the site. Other sawmills and shingle mills operated in Leland during the years 1885–1900.

As early as 1880, commercial fishermen sailed out of the harbor to catch trout and whitefish, building wooden shacks where they processed their catch and serviced their fleet. Up to eight powered tugs once sailed out of "Fishtown", as the buildings came to be known. Today, the historic fishing settlement and two fish tugs, Joy and Janice Sue, are owned by a non-profit organization, the Fishtown Preservation Society. Fishtown is home to a working fishery and a thriving charter fishing business. The riverfront is lined by a boardwalk and quaint shacks that have been converted into tourist shops.

Around 1900, wealthy individuals from Chicago, Detroit, and other Midwestern industrial centers began to visit Leland and build summer cottages, arriving by Lake Michigan passenger steamer or by Lake Leelanau steamer from the railhead near Traverse City. This led to the construction of resort hotels, and the growth of Leland as a summer resort town.

Geography
Leland is in northern Leelanau County, on the west side of the Leelanau Peninsula. It is bordered to the west by Lake Michigan and to the east by the northern section of Lake Leelanau. The Leland River runs through the center of the community, connecting the two lakes.

Leland lies just north of the 45th parallel. A sign on M-22 south of Leland reads "45th Parallel Halfway Between Equator & North Pole".

Demographics

Transportation
, the only road connecting Leland to the rest of the county. It leads northeast  to Northport and southwest  to Glen Arbor.
Manitou Island Transit, ferry service to North and South Manitou Island

Cultural institutions
 Leelanau Historical Society and Museum, 203 East Cedar Street
 Leland Township Library, 203 East Cedar Street

Michigan historical sites
 Walter Best Women's Club (Old Art Building), 1125 Main Street
 Riverside Inn, 302 East River Street
 Leelanau County Jail, 106 Chandler Street
 Leland Historic District (Fishtown)
 Greycote Cottage, 110 Pearl Street
 W. K. Hatt Cottage, 410 North Main Street

Gallery

Notable people

 Tim Allen (born 1953), comedian, actor
 Thomas W. L. Ashley (1923-2010), U.S. representative (Ohio)
 The Ball Brothers, industrialists and philanthropists
 Charles E. Bennison (born 1943), Episcopal bishop of Pennsylvania
 Barbara Ninde Byfield (1930-1988), author, illustrator
 Mark Clark (1896-1984), WW2 general, Citadel president
 John J. Gilligan (1921-2013), U.S. representative, governor of Ohio
 Alisha Glass (born 1988), Olympic volleyball player 
 Jim Harrison (1937-2016), author, township resident from 1968-2002
 Harlan Hatcher (1898-1998), University of Michigan president
 Arthur F. Lederle (1887–1972), U.S. federal judge
 Alvin Mansfield Owsley (1888-1967), attorney, diplomat
 Keewaydinoquay Peschel (ca. 1919-1999), ethnobotanist, herbalist, educator
 Emelia Schaub (1891-1995), county prosecutor, first female attorney in Michigan
 Kathleen Sebelius (born 1948), U.S. Secretary of Health and Human Services, governor of Kansas, daughter of John J. Gilligan
 Tobin Sprout (born 1955), songwriter, guitarist (Guided by Voices)

References

Further reading
 Clarke Historical Library, Central, Michigan University, Bibliography for Leelanau County
 Bogue, Margaret. Around the Shores of Lake Michigan: A Guide to Historic Sites. Madison, WI: University of Wisconsin Press, 1985.
 Byron, M. Christine, and Thomas R. Wilson. Vintage Views of Leelanau County. Chelsea, MI: Sleeping Bear Press, 2002.
 Dickinson, Frederick W. A Short History of the Leland Iron Works. Annotated by Harley W. Rhodehamel. Leland, MI: Leelanau Historical Society, 1996.
 Littell, Edmund M. 100 Years in Leelanau. Leland: The Print Shop, 1965.
 Littell, Joseph. Leland: An Historical Sketch. [Indianapolis, IN: Indianapolis Printing Co., 1920], reprinted 1959.
 Mitchell, John C. Wood Boats of Leelanau: A Photographic Journal. Leland, MI: Leelanau Historical Society, 2007.
 Reed, Earl H. The Dune Country. Berrien Springs, MI: Hardscrabble Books, 1979. [Reprint of 1916 Edition].
 Ruchhoft, Robert H. Exploring North Manitou, South Manitou, High and Garden Islands of the Lake Michigan Archipelago. Cincinnati, OH: Pucelle Press, 1991.
 Sommers, Laurie Kay. Fishtown: Leland, Michigan's Historic Fishery. Traverse City, MI: Arbutus Press, 2012.
 Wood, Mable C. Scooterville, U.S.A. Grand Rapids, MI: Eerdmans, 1962.

External links
 Leland Michigan Chamber of Commerce
 Fishtown pictures

Populated places established in 1853
Traverse City micropolitan area
Unincorporated communities in Leelanau County, Michigan
Unincorporated communities in Michigan
Census-designated places in Leelanau County, Michigan
Census-designated places in Michigan
Former county seats in Michigan